Dennis Michael Riddleberger (born November 22, 1945) is an American former Major League Baseball pitcher.

He was 24–16 with a 3.22 earned run average over four seasons in their farm system when he was traded to the Washington Senators for George Brunet on August 31, . That September, he was called up by the Senators, making his major league debut against the Baltimore Orioles.

Riddleberger spent the entire  season in the majors, but after getting off to a slow start (11.12 ERA in April), found himself doing mostly mop-up duty. The Senators were 14-43 in games in which Rittleberger pitched. He ended the season with a 3-1 record and a far more respectable 3.23 ERA. He earned his only career save on July 5 against the Cleveland Indians.

Shortly after the Senators moved to the Dallas–Fort Worth metroplex and were rebranded as the Texas Rangers, Riddleberger was traded along with Del Unser, Terry Ley and Gary Jones to the Indians for Roy Foster, Rich Hand, Mike Paul and Ken Suarez at the Winter Meetings on December 2, 1971. He spent  with the Indians' triple A affiliate, the Oklahoma City 89ers before retiring.

References

External links

1945 births
Living people
Baseball players from Virginia
Batavia Trojans players
Cleveland Indians players
Columbus Jets players
Gastonia Pirates players
Major League Baseball pitchers
People from Clifton Forge, Virginia
Oklahoma City 89ers players
Old Dominion Monarchs baseball players
Salem Rebels players
Washington Senators (1961–1971) players